Ian Sarfas (born 10 June 1970 in London) is a former English professional darts player who currently on British Darts Organisation from the 1990s.

Darts career
Sarfas played in the 1994 BDO World Darts Championship, beating Dave Askew in the first round before losing to Denmark's Troels Rusel in the second round. Sarfas previously reached the quarter-finals of the 1993 British Open.

World Championship Results

BDO
 1994: Second round: (lost to Troels Rusel 1–3) (sets)

External links
Profile and stats on Darts Database

English darts players
Living people
1970 births
People from Plaistow, Newham
British Darts Organisation players